Revenge on Society is the second full-length album by Blood for Blood, and was released on April 17, 1998.

Track listing
 "Enter The Criminal Mind" (White Trash Rob) – 1:41
 "A Bitch Called Hope"  – 2:49
 "Die Laughing"  – 4:22
 "Wasted Youth Crew (My Kind Belong Nowhere)" (White Trash Rob) – 4:25
 "All Fucked Up"  – 2:38
 "Evil In The Brain"  – 4:44
 "Revenge On Society"  – 3:25
 "Ya' Still A Paper Gangster"  – 2:44
 "I Am The Enemy"  – 3:47
 "My Time Is Yet To Come"  – 5:29
 "Shut My Eyes Forever" – 4:57
 "Last Call....... Fuck You" (The Drunk & Disorderly, Assault & Battery Philharmonic Orchestra)  – 0:29

 All tracks written by White Trash Rob and Buddha unless stated

Personnel

 Buddha (vocals)
 White Trash Rob (guitar, vocals)
 McFarland (bass)
 Mike Mahoney (drums)
 Recorded on February 13 – 26 1998 at The Outpost, Stoughton, Massachusetts, USA
 Produced by Jim Siegel and White Trash Rob
 Engineered and mixed by Jim Siegel
 Mastered by Henk Kooistra at 9West Mastering, Marlborough, Massachusetts, USA
 Shane Williams (vocals)

External links
 Victory Records

1998 albums
Blood for Blood albums